Cinema Verite is a 2011 HBO drama film directed by Shari Springer Berman and Robert Pulcini. The film's main ensemble cast starred Diane Lane, Tim Robbins, James Gandolfini and Patrick Fugit. The film follows a fictionalized account of the production of An American Family, a 1973 PBS documentary television series that is said to be one of the earliest examples of the reality television genre. Principal photography was completed in Southern California. The film premiered on April 23, 2011.

Plot synopsis
The film begins in 1971 with Craig Gilbert (James Gandolfini) discussing with Pat Loud (Diane Lane) the idea of a documentary series that would concern her family's day-to-day lives in Santa Barbara, CA. Pat considers the proposal and accepts, amidst her son Lance (Thomas Dekker) moving to New York City. Pat's husband Bill (Tim Robbins) travels often away on business, leaving his wife alone to care for their five children.

The crew (Patrick Fugit, Shanna Collins) moves in with the Louds and begins to document them. Relations between Pat and Bill grow frayed due to his time away and the stress of the TV show's production. Gilbert tells Pat of his suspicions surrounding Bill's trips away, giving fairly strong evidence that he is cheating on her. The crew fights with Gilbert about his documentary technique, as he makes them film many personal moments.

After surreptitiously duplicating the keys to Bill's office, Pat makes a late night trip to the office and discovers documents that confirm he is cheating on Pat with two other women, resulting in Pat's preparations to file for a divorce. Angry, she tells Gilbert to have cameras there when she tells Bill, wanting "his bimbos to see it, the whole world to see it." Against her wishes, he films Pat's conversation with her brother and his wife.

Pat begins to regret her decision to let Gilbert film the break up, and tries to get one of her sons to tell him while driving Bill home instead. He, however, does not work up the courage to do this, and Pat kicks Bill out of her home on camera.

The film cuts to one year later, when An American Family is experiencing its premiere. The show airs to strong television ratings but much criticism of members of the family, in particular Pat for how she came off on camera and Lance for his homosexuality. The family then gets together to "fight back", addressing their critics by appearing on many talk shows.

Title cards at film's end offer updates for each Loud family member. Lance died of AIDS-related hepatitis in 2001; his last wish for his parents was to cohabitate. They currently live together in Los Angeles.

Cast
 Diane Lane as Pat Loud
 Tim Robbins as Bill Loud
 James Gandolfini as Craig Gilbert
 Kathleen Quinlan as Mary
 Thomas Dekker as Lance Loud
 Patrick Fugit as Alan Raymond
 Shanna Collins as Susan Raymond
 Willam Belli as Candy Darling
 Lolita Davidovich as Valerie
 Kyle Riabko as Jackie Curtis
 Kaitlyn Dever as Michelle Loud
 Nick Eversman as Grant Loud
 Johnny Simmons as Kevin Loud
 Caitlin Custer as Delilah Loud
 Jake Richardson as Tommy Goodwin

Production
Principal photography was completed primarily in Los Angeles, California.

The film is presented in chapters, with chapter titles such as The Chelsea and The Battle for the Camera Begins. When the chapter titles are shown, short clips from the original 1973 documentary are shown alongside in split screen format.

Critical reception
Cinema Verite met with a positive reception from television critics. On review aggregator Metacritic the film received a "generally positive" score of 74 out of 100, based on 23 reviews.

Awards and nominations

Notes

References

Further reading

External links
 
 
 

2011 drama films
2011 television films
2011 films
American LGBT-related films
Films about television
Films based on television series
Films directed by Shari Springer Berman and Robert Pulcini
Films shot in California
HBO Films films
LGBT-related films based on actual events
Films scored by Rolfe Kent
2011 LGBT-related films
American drama television films
2010s American films